The 2011–12 season of the Liga I Feminin was the 22nd season of Romania's premier women's football league. The season started on 4 September 2011 and ended on 6 June 2012. Olimpia Cluj were the defending champions and successfully defended their title on the last matchday.

Changes from 2010 to 2011
 Seven new clubs entered a team to the league:Independenta Baia Mare, UT Arad, CFR Timișoara, Negrea Resita, Navobi Iasi, CS Viitorul 2010 Buzau and CS Blue Angel Cristian-Brasov.
 As the league now has 20 teams it is divided into eastern and western divisions with 10 teams each. After a double round robin, i.e. 18 matches per team, the top two teams will move on to play the championship round. The first-place finishers get three points right from the start and then a new double round robin is placed. After that the champion qualifies to the 2012–13 UEFA Women's Champions League.

Teams

Seria est

Seria vest

Standings

First stage
Each team plays 18 games.

East

West

Championship play-off
The top two of each group advance to the final stage. The six teams play each other two times for a total of six games. The group winners Olimpia and Targu Mures started with three bonus points.

Top scorer
Cosmina Dusa won the top-scorer award for a second season in a row with 71 goals.

References

External links
 Official site
 Season on soccerway.com

Rom
Fem
Romanian Superliga (women's football) seasons